SFRS2-interacting protein is a protein that in humans is encoded by the SFRS2IP gene.

Interactions
SFRS2IP has been shown to interact with U2AF2.

References

Further reading